The 1993–94 NBA season was the Houston Rockets' 27th season in the National Basketball Association, and their 23rd season in Houston. During the off-season, the Rockets acquired Mario Elie from the Portland Trail Blazers. The Rockets went off to a great start, winning their first fifteen games of the season to tie the 1948–49 Washington Capitols for the best unbeaten record to open a season, while also posting a 14–0 record in November, before the Golden State Warriors surpassed it in 2015. After losing to the Atlanta Hawks, 133–111 on the road on December 3, the Rockets won their next seven games as well, falling just one victory shy of tying the 1969–70 Knicks (23–1) for the best record with one defeat in NBA history. However, the Rockets would cool off as the season progressed, at one point losing four games in a row in January. Still, they held a 34–12 record at the All-Star break, and finished first place in the Midwest Division with a 58–24 record, a franchise record that stood until the 2017-18 team recorded their 59th win.

Hakeem Olajuwon averaged 27.3 points, 11.9 rebounds, 3.6 assists, 1.6 steals and 3.7 blocks per game, and won the league's Most Valuable Player award, ahead of David Robinson of the San Antonio Spurs, and Scottie Pippen of the Chicago Bulls. Anchoring one of the league's best defenses, Olajuwon also won the NBA Defensive Player of the Year Award for the second consecutive year, also beating out Robinson by a narrow 23 to 22 votes. He was also named to the All-NBA First Team, NBA All-Defensive First Team, and was selected for the 1994 NBA All-Star Game. In addition, Otis Thorpe averaged 14.0 points and 10.6 rebounds per game, while Vernon Maxwell provided the team with 13.6 points, 5.1 assists and 1.6 steals per game, Kenny Smith contributed 11.6 points per game, and second-year forward Robert Horry provided with 9.9 points and 5.4 rebounds per game. Elie contributed 9.3 points per game off the bench as the team's sixth man.

In the playoffs, the Rockets defeated the Portland Trail Blazers, 3–1 in the Western Conference First Round. In the Western Conference Semi-finals, the Rockets trailed 0–2 to the Phoenix Suns, but would win the series in seven games, then defeat the 5th-seeded Utah Jazz, 4–1 in the Western Conference Finals.

In the 1994 NBA Finals, they defeated the New York Knicks in seven games after trailing 3–2, and won their first championship in franchise history. It was the Rockets' third NBA finals appearance, after 1981 and 1986. Olajuwon was the only player of the 1985–86 Rockets to still be on the 1993–94 team. By winning the Finals MVP, Olajuwon also became the first player to win regular season MVP, Defensive Player of the Year, and Finals MVP in the same season. The Rockets also became the first team from the Midwest Division since the Milwaukee Bucks 23 years prior to win the NBA title.

Offseason

NBA draft

Roster

Regular season

Season standings

Record vs. opponents

Game log

Regular season

|- align="center" bgcolor="#ccffcc"
| 1
| November 5, 1993
| New Jersey
| W 110–88
| Hakeem Olajuwon (24)
| Hakeem Olajuwon (19)
| Vernon Maxwell (8)
| The Summit11,128
| 1–0
|- align="center" bgcolor="#ccffcc"
| 2
| November 7, 1993
| @ Portland
| W 106–92
| Hakeem Olajuwon (29)
| Hakeem Olajuwon (12)
| Hakeem Olajuwon (7)
| Memorial Coliseum12,888
| 2–0
|- align="center" bgcolor="#ccffcc"
| 3
| November 9, 1993
| @ Golden State
| W 102–93
| Hakeem Olajuwon (32)
| Otis Thorpe (13)
| Vernon Maxwell (8)
| Oakland-Alameda County Coliseum Arena15,025
| 3–0
|- align="center" bgcolor="#ccffcc"
| 4
| November 11, 1993
| Minnesota
| W 107–99
|
|
|
| The Summit
| 4–0
|- align="center" bgcolor="#ccffcc"
| 5
| November 13, 1993
| Phoenix
| W 99–95
|
|
|
| The Summit
| 5–0
|- align="center" bgcolor="#ccffcc"
| 6
| November 15, 1993
| @ Philadelphia
| W 88–84
|
|
|
| The Spectrum
| 6–0
|- align="center" bgcolor="#ccffcc"
| 7
| November 16, 1993
| @ New Jersey
| W 90–84
|
|
|
| Brendan Byrne Arena
| 7–0
|- align="center" bgcolor="#ccffcc"
| 8
| November 18, 1993
| @ Indiana
| W 99–83
|
|
|
| Market Square Arena
| 8–0
|- align="center" bgcolor="#ccffcc"
| 9
| November 20, 1993
| L.A. Clippers
| W 108–86
|
|
|
| The Summit
| 9–0
|- align="center" bgcolor="#ccffcc"
| 10
| November 23, 1993
| Chicago
| W 100–93
|
|
|
| The Summit
| 10–0
|- align="center" bgcolor="#ccffcc"
| 11
| November 24, 1993
| @ Utah
| W 95–93 (OT)
|
|
|
| Delta Center
| 11–0
|- align="center" bgcolor="#ccffcc"
| 12
| November 26, 1993
| @ Sacramento
| W 92–89
|
|
|
| ARCO Arena
| 12–0
|- align="center" bgcolor="#ccffcc"
| 13
| November 27, 1993
| @ L.A. Clippers
| W 82–80
|
|
|
| Los Angeles Memorial Sports Arena
| 13–0
|- align="center" bgcolor="#ccffcc"
| 14
| November 30, 1993
| Milwaukee
| W 102–91
|
|
|
| The Summit
| 14–0

|- align="center" bgcolor="#ccffcc"
| 15
| December 2, 1993
| @ New York
| W 94–85
|
|
|
| Madison Square Garden
| 15–0
|- align="center" bgcolor="#ffcccc"
| 16
| December 3, 1993
| @ Atlanta
| L 111–133
|
|
|
| The Omni
| 15–1
|- align="center" bgcolor="#ccffcc"
| 17
| December 5, 1993
| @ Cleveland
| W 99–98
|
|
|
| Richfield Coliseum
| 16–1
|- align="center" bgcolor="#ccffcc"
| 18
| December 7, 1993
| Charlotte
| W 121–102
|
|
|
| The Summit
| 17–1
|- align="center" bgcolor="#ccffcc"
| 19
| December 9, 1993
| Miami
| W 115–109 (OT)
|
|
|
| The Summit
| 18–1
|- align="center" bgcolor="#ccffcc"
| 20
| December 11, 1993
| Seattle
| W 82–75
|
|
|
| The Summit
| 19–1
|- align="center" bgcolor="#ccffcc"
| 21
| December 14, 1993
| @ Miami
| W 97–88
|
|
|
| Miami Arena
| 20–1
|- align="center" bgcolor="#ccffcc"
| 22
| December 18, 1993
| Dallas
| W 104–93
|
|
|
| The Summit
| 21–1
|- align="center" bgcolor="#ccffcc"
| 23
| December 21, 1993
| @ San Antonio
| W 90–88
|
|
|
| Alamodome
| 22–1
|- align="center" bgcolor="#ffcccc"
| 24
| December 23, 1993
| Denver
| L 93–106
|
|
|
| The Summit
| 22–2
|- align="center" bgcolor="#ffcccc"
| 25
| December 25, 1993
| @ Phoenix
| L 91–111
|
|
|
| America West Arena
| 22–3
|- align="center" bgcolor="#ccffcc"
| 26
| December 26, 1993
| @ L.A. Lakers
| W 118–93
|
|
|
| Great Western Forum
| 23–3
|- align="center" bgcolor="#ffcccc"
| 27
| December 28, 1993
| @ Seattle
| L 97–112
|
|
|
| Seattle Center Coliseum
| 23–4
|- align="center" bgcolor="#ccffcc"
| 28
| December 30, 1993
| @ Minnesota
| W 110–104
|
|
|
| Target Center
| 24–4

|- align="center" bgcolor="#ccffcc"
| 29
| January 4, 1994
| Portland
| W 106–95
|
|
|
| The Summit
| 25–4
|- align="center" bgcolor="#ccffcc"
| 30
| January 5, 1994
| @ Dallas
| W 114–102
|
|
|
| Reunion Arena
| 26–4
|- align="center" bgcolor="#ccffcc"
| 31
| January 8, 1994
| Philadelphia
| W 100–93
|
|
|
| The Summit
| 27–4
|- align="center" bgcolor="#ffcccc"
| 32
| January 10, 1994
| @ Orlando
| L 100–115
|
|
|
| Orlando Arena
| 27–5
|- align="center" bgcolor="#ccffcc"
| 33
| January 12, 1994
| @ Boston
| W 94–84
|
|
|
| Boston Garden
| 28–5
|- align="center" bgcolor="#ffcccc"
| 34
| January 13, 1994
| @ Washington
| L 102–120
|
|
|
| USAir Arena
| 28–6
|- align="center" bgcolor="#ffcccc"
| 35
| January 15, 1994
| @ Chicago
| L 76–82
|
|
|
| Chicago Stadium
| 28–7
|- align="center" bgcolor="#ffcccc"
| 36
| January 18, 1994
| Boston
| L 83–95
|
|
|
| The Summit
| 28–8
|- align="center" bgcolor="#ffcccc"
| 37
| January 20, 1994
| @ Denver
| L 106–111 (2OT)
|
|
|
| McNichols Sports Arena
| 28–9
|- align="center" bgcolor="#ccffcc"
| 38
| January 22, 1994
| Utah
| W 106–101
|
|
|
| The Summit
| 29–9
|- align="center" bgcolor="#ccffcc"
| 39
| January 25, 1994
| Cleveland
| W 96–93
|
|
|
| The Summit
| 30–9
|- align="center" bgcolor="#ccffcc"
| 40
| January 27, 1994
| Sacramento
| W 113–97
|
|
|
| The Summit
| 31–9
|- align="center" bgcolor="#ffcccc"
| 41
| January 29, 1994
| Indiana
| L 108–119
|
|
|
| The Summit
| 31–10

|- align="center" bgcolor="#ffcccc"
| 42
| February 1, 1994
| @ Utah
| L 88–104
|
|
|
| Delta Center
| 31–11
|- align="center" bgcolor="#ccffcc"
| 43
| February 3, 1994
| L.A. Lakers
| W 99–88
|
|
|
| The Summit
| 32–11
|- align="center" bgcolor="#ccffcc"
| 44
| February 6, 1994
| Minnesota
| W 110–104
|
|
|
| The Summit
| 33–11
|- align="center" bgcolor="#ffcccc"
| 45
| February 8, 1994
| @ Milwaukee
| L 98–106
|
|
|
| Bradley Center
| 33–12
|- align="center" bgcolor="#ccffcc"
| 46
| February 10, 1994
| @ Detroit
| W 104–81
|
|
|
| The Palace of Auburn Hills
| 34–12
|- align="center"
|colspan="9" bgcolor="#bbcaff"|All-Star Break
|- style="background:#cfc;"
|- bgcolor="#bbffbb"
|- align="center" bgcolor="#ccffcc"
| 47
| February 15, 1994
| Atlanta
| W 103–99
|
|
|
| The Summit
| 35–12
|- align="center" bgcolor="#ffcccc"
| 48
| February 16, 1994
| @ Charlotte
| L 97–102
|
|
|
| Charlotte Coliseum
| 35–13
|- align="center" bgcolor="#ccffcc"
| 49
| February 19, 1994
| Phoenix
| W 106–88
|
|
|
| The Summit
| 36–13
|- align="center" bgcolor="#ccffcc"
| 50
| February 22, 1994
| Denver
| W 98–97
|
|
|
| The Summit
| 37–13
|- align="center" bgcolor="#ccffcc"
| 51
| February 24, 1994
| New York
| W 93–73
|
|
|
| The Summit
| 38–13
|- align="center" bgcolor="#ffcccc"
| 52
| February 26, 1994
| Utah
| L 85–95
|
|
|
| The Summit
| 38–14
|- align="center" bgcolor="#ffcccc"
| 53
| February 28, 1994
| @ Utah
| L 85–89
|
|
|
| Delta Center
| 38–15

|- align="center" bgcolor="#ccffcc"
| 54
| March 1, 1994
| Orlando
| W 97–85
|
|
|
| The Summit
| 39–15
|- align="center" bgcolor="#ccffcc"
| 55
| March 5, 1994
| L.A. Clippers
| W 124–107
|
|
|
| The Summit
| 40–15
|- align="center" bgcolor="#ffcccc"
| 56
| March 8, 1994
| @ San Antonio
| L 99–115
|
|
|
| Alamodome
| 40–16
|- align="center" bgcolor="#ccffcc"
| 57
| March 10, 1994
| Seattle
| W 87–82
|
|
|
| The Summit
| 41–16
|- align="center" bgcolor="#ffcccc"
| 58
| March 12, 1994
| San Antonio
| L 98–109
|
|
|
| The Summit
| 41–17
|- align="center" bgcolor="#ccffcc"
| 59
| March 13, 1994
| @ Dallas
| W 100–93
|
|
|
| Reunion Arena
| 42–17
|- align="center" bgcolor="#ccffcc"
| 60
| March 15, 1994
| Portland
| W 105–99
|
|
|
| The Summit
| 43–17
|- align="center" bgcolor="#ccffcc"
| 61
| March 17, 1994
| Golden State
| W 112–99
|
|
|
| The Summit
| 44–17
|- align="center" bgcolor="#ccffcc"
| 62
| March 19, 1994
| Detroit
| W 106–88
|
|
|
| The Summit
| 45–17
|- align="center" bgcolor="#ccffcc"
| 63
| March 21, 1994
| Washington
| W 128–112
|
|
|
| The Summit
| 46–17
|- align="center" bgcolor="#ffcccc"
| 64
| March 22, 1994
| @ Minnesota
| L 81–83
|
|
|
| Target Center
| 46–18
|- align="center" bgcolor="#ccffcc"
| 65
| March 24, 1994
| L.A. Lakers
| W 113–107
|
|
|
| The Summit
| 47–18
|- align="center" bgcolor="#ccffcc"
| 66
| March 26, 1994
| Utah
| W 98–83
|
|
|
| The Summit
| 48–18
|- align="center" bgcolor="#ffcccc"
| 67
| March 27, 1994
| @ Phoenix
| L 98–113
|
|
|
| America West Arena
| 48–19
|- align="center" bgcolor="#ccffcc"
| 68
| March 29, 1994
| @ Sacramento
| W 122–101
|
|
|
| ARCO Arena
| 49–19
|- align="center" bgcolor="#ccffcc"
| 69
| March 30, 1994
| @ Golden State
| W 114–104
|
|
|
| Oakland-Alameda County Coliseum Arena
| 50–19

|- align="center" bgcolor="#ffcccc"
| 70
| April 1, 1994
| @ L.A. Lakers
| L 88–101
|
|
|
| Great Western Forum
| 50–20
|- align="center" bgcolor="#ccffcc"
| 71
| April 3, 1994
| @ L.A. Clippers
| W 106–98
|
|
|
| Los Angeles Memorial Sports Arena
| 51–20
|- align="center" bgcolor="#ccffcc"
| 72
| April 7, 1994
| Golden State
| W 134–102
|
|
|
| The Summit
| 52–20
|- align="center" bgcolor="#ccffcc"
| 73
| April 9, 1994
| San Antonio
| W 100–89
|
|
|
| The Summit
| 53–20
|- align="center" bgcolor="#ccffcc"
| 74
| April 10, 1994
| @ Denver
| W 93–92
|
|
|
| McNichols Sports Arena
| 54–20
|- align="center" bgcolor="#ccffcc"
| 75
| April 12, 1994
| Minnesota
| W 98–89
|
|
|
| The Summit
| 55–20
|- align="center" bgcolor="#ccffcc"
| 76
| April 14, 1994
| Sacramento
| W 104–99
|
|
|
| The Summit
| 56–20
|- align="center" bgcolor="#ffcccc"
| 77
| April 16, 1994
| @ Seattle
| L 97–100
|
|
|
| Seattle Center Coliseum
| 56–21
|- align="center" bgcolor="#ccffcc"
| 78
| April 17, 1994
| @ Portland
| W 119–110
|
|
|
| Memorial Coliseum
| 57–21
|- align="center" bgcolor="#ffcccc"
| 79
| April 19, 1994
| @ San Antonio
| L 80–90
|
|
|
| Alamodome
| 57–22
|- align="center" bgcolor="#ccffcc"
| 80
| April 21, 1994
| Dallas
| W 104–93
|
|
|
| The Summit
| 58–22
|- align="center" bgcolor="#ffcccc"
| 81
| April 22, 1994
| @ Dallas
| L 95–107
|
|
|
| Reunion Arena
| 58–23
|- align="center" bgcolor="#ffcccc"
| 82
| April 24, 1994
| Denver
| L 107–115
|
|
|
| The Summit
| 58–24

Player statistics

Regular season

Playoffs

Playoffs

Game log

|- align="center" bgcolor="#ccffcc"
| 1
| April 29, 1994
| Portland
| W 114–104
| Hakeem Olajuwon (26)
| Otis Thorpe (12)
| Maxwell, Smith (7)
| The Summit16,333
| 1–0
|- align="center" bgcolor="#ccffcc"
| 2
| May 1, 1994
| Portland
| W 115–104
| Hakeem Olajuwon (46)
| Otis Thorpe (12)
| Sam Cassell (9)
| The Summit16,355
| 2–0
|- align="center" bgcolor="#ffcccc"
| 3
| May 3, 1994
| @ Portland
| L 115–118
| Hakeem Olajuwon (36)
| Otis Thorpe (11)
| Olajuwon, Horry (6)
| Memorial Coliseum12,888
| 2–1
|- align="center" bgcolor="#ccffcc"
| 4
| May 6, 1994
| @ Portland
| W 92–89
| Hakeem Olajuwon (28)
| Hakeem Olajuwon (16)
| three players tied (3)
| Memorial Coliseum12,888
| 3–1
|-

|- align="center" bgcolor="#ffcccc"
| 1
| May 8, 1994
| Phoenix
| L 87–91
| Hakeem Olajuwon (36)
| Hakeem Olajuwon (16)
| Maxwell, Horry (8)
| The Summit15,073
| 0–1
|- align="center" bgcolor="#ffcccc"
| 2
| May 11, 1994
| Phoenix
| L 117–124 (OT)
| Hakeem Olajuwon (31)
| Hakeem Olajuwon (17)
| Vernon Maxwell (9)
| The Summit16,611
| 0–2
|- align="center" bgcolor="#ccffcc"
| 3
| May 13, 1994
| @ Phoenix
| W 118–102
| Vernon Maxwell (34)
| Hakeem Olajuwon (15)
| Sam Cassell (10)
| America West Arena19,023
| 1–2
|- align="center" bgcolor="#ccffcc"
| 4
| May 15, 1994
| @ Phoenix
| W 107–96
| Hakeem Olajuwon (28)
| Otis Thorpe (13)
| Hakeem Olajuwon (8)
| America West Arena19,023
| 2–2
|- align="center" bgcolor="#ccffcc"
| 5
| May 17, 1994
| Phoenix
| W 109–86
| Thorpe, Olajuwon (20)
| Hakeem Olajuwon (13)
| Kenny Smith (8)
| The Summit16,611
| 3–2
|- align="center" bgcolor="#ffcccc"
| 6
| May 19, 1994
| @ Phoenix
| L 89–103
| Hakeem Olajuwon (23)
| Hakeem Olajuwon (12)
| Hakeem Olajuwon (5)
| America West Arena19,023
| 3–3
|- align="center" bgcolor="#ccffcc"
| 7
| May 21, 1994
| Phoenix
| W 104–94
| Hakeem Olajuwon (37)
| Hakeem Olajuwon (17)
| Sam Cassell (7)
| The Summit16,611
| 4–3
|-

|- align="center" bgcolor="#ccffcc"
| 1
| May 23, 1994
| Utah
| W 100–86
| Hakeem Olajuwon (31)
| Robert Horry (11)
| Sam Cassell (7)
| The Summit16,611
| 1–0
|- align="center" bgcolor="#ccffcc"
| 2
| May 25, 1994
| Utah
| W 104–99
| Hakeem Olajuwon (41)
| Hakeem Olajuwon (13)
| Kenny Smith (7)
| The Summit16,611
| 2–0
|- align="center" bgcolor="#ffcccc"
| 3
| May 27, 1994
| @ Utah
| L 86–95
| Hakeem Olajuwon (29)
| Hakeem Olajuwon (13)
| Hakeem Olajuwon (5)
| Delta Center19,911
| 2–1
|- align="center" bgcolor="#ccffcc"
| 4
| May 29, 1994
| @ Utah
| W 80–78
| Kenny Smith (25)
| Robert Horry (10)
| Robert Horry (5)
| Delta Center19,911
| 3–1
|- align="center" bgcolor="#ccffcc"
| 5
| May 31, 1994
| Utah
| W 94–83
| Olajuwon, Horry (22)
| Otis Thorpe (16)
| Sam Cassell (7)
| The Summit16,611
| 4–1
|-

|- align="center" bgcolor="#ccffcc"
| 1
| June 8, 1994
| New York
| W 85–78
| Hakeem Olajuwon (28)
| Otis Thorpe (16)
| Kenny Smith (5)
| The Summit16,611
| 1–0
|- align="center" bgcolor="#ffcccc"
| 2
| June 10, 1994
| New York
| L 83–91
| Hakeem Olajuwon (25)
| Otis Thorpe (12)
| Kenny Smith (6)
| The Summit16,611
| 1–1
|- align="center" bgcolor="#ccffcc"
| 3
| June 12, 1994
| @ New York
| W 93–89
| Hakeem Olajuwon (21)
| Hakeem Olajuwon (11)
| Hakeem Olajuwon (7)
| Madison Square Garden19,763
| 2–1
|- align="center" bgcolor="#ffcccc"
| 4
| June 15, 1994
| @ New York
| L 82–91
| Hakeem Olajuwon (32)
| Otis Thorpe (10)
| Sam Cassell (5)
| Madison Square Garden19,763
| 2–2
|- align="center" bgcolor="#ffcccc"
| 5
| June 17, 1994
| @ New York
| L 84–91
| Hakeem Olajuwon (27)
| Otis Thorpe (13)
| Robert Horry (6)
| Madison Square Garden19,763
| 2–3
|- align="center" bgcolor="#ccffcc"
| 6
| June 19, 1994
| New York
| W 86–84
| Hakeem Olajuwon (30)
| Olajuwon, Thorpe (10)
| Otis Thorpe (6)
| The Summit16,611
| 3–3
|- align="center" bgcolor="#ccffcc"
| 7
| June 22, 1994
| New York
| W 90–84
| Hakeem Olajuwon (25)
| Hakeem Olajuwon (10)
| Hakeem Olajuwon (7)
| The Summit16,611
| 4–3
|-

Interruption of Game 5 NBA Finals telecast by O. J. Simpson car chase

During Game 5 (June 17, 1994), most NBC affiliates (with the noted exception being WNBC-TV out of New York City) split the coverage of the game between NFL Hall of Famer O. J. Simpson's slow-speed freeway chase with the LAPD. At the time, Simpson had been an NFL analyst on NBC. A visibly confused and distraught Bob Costas (NBC's anchor for their NBA Finals coverage) said during the telecast from Madison Square Garden that the Simpson situation was "not just tragic but now surreal".

Award winners
 Hakeem Olajuwon, NBA Most Valuable Player Award
 Hakeem Olajuwon, NBA Finals Most Valuable Player Award
 Hakeem Olajuwon, NBA Defensive Player of the Year Award
 Hakeem Olajuwon, All-NBA First Team
 Hakeem Olajuwon, NBA All-Defensive First Team

NBA All-Star Game

Transactions

References

External links
 Rockets on Basketball Reference

Houston Rockets seasons
Western Conference (NBA) championship seasons
NBA championship seasons
Hous